Kylie Rae Harris (May 15, 1989  September 4, 2019) was an American singer-songwriter. She was born in Wylie, Texas.

Career 
At age twelve, Harris was enrolled in a vocal camp and began crafting her own songs and playing guitar. By the time she graduated from high school, Harris earned a music scholarship and a welding scholarship, but took neither and decided to press on with her musical career. She was one of the featured artists in Troubadour, TX, a television show documenting her rising career as a Texas country singer-songwriter.

On July 1, 2010, Harris released her debut album titled All the Right Reasons, followed by an EP in 2013 titled Taking It Back.

In 2013, Harris began working on material for a second full-length album and toured with fellow Troubadour, TX star Zane Williams throughout the state. Then in March 2019, she released a new self titled EP.

Death 
Harris died on September 4, 2019, when her car collided with another near Taos, New Mexico. She was 30 years old and is survived by her daughter. Harris clipped the rear end of a vehicle in the right lane, swerved into oncoming traffic, and hit another car head-on. The driver of the other car, 16-year-old Taos High School student Maria Elena Cruz, was also killed.

Harris had a drunk driving conviction from 2017. As part of her conviction, she was ordered to have an ignition interlock device installed in her car.

References

External links 

 

1989 births
2019 deaths
21st-century American women singers
American country singer-songwriters
American women country singers
Country musicians from New Mexico
Country musicians from Texas
Road incident deaths in New Mexico
Singer-songwriters from Texas
People from Wylie, Texas
21st-century American singers